The 1996–97 season was the first in the history of the Glasgow Warriors as a professional side. The Warriors rugby union provincial side was created by turning the amateur provincial side Glasgow District into a professional outfit. During this season, the newly professional side competed as Glasgow Rugby.

This season saw Glasgow Rugby compete in the Scottish Inter-District Championship and the European Challenge Cup.

Overview

Formation of the professional side

District sides had a difficult metamorphosis into their respective professional sides in Scotland. The district sides were not members of the Scottish Rugby Union; the amateur clubs were. This meant that many top amateur club sides fancied their own chances of turning professional instead of the district sides.

The International Rugby Board embraced professionalism in 1995. The district versus clubs debate in Scotland meant that no Scottish sides were entered into the Heineken Cup for season 1995-96. A vote was held in early 1996 and although the debate was frosty the vote ended decisively for districts 178 - 24.

Glasgow Rugby was formed for season 1996–97.

By October 1996, the SRU had signed 36 players on professional contracts. These 36 players were distributed between Border Reivers, Caledonia Reds, Edinburgh Rugby and Glasgow Warriors.

SRU contracted players: Graeme Beveridge, Steven Brotherstone, Nick Broughton, Millan Browne, Gordon Bulloch, Darren Burns, Graeme Burns, Craig Chalmers, Graham Dall, Ian Elliot, Gareth Flockhart, Cameron Glasgow, Hugh Gilmour, Paddy Haslett, Jim Hay, Ian Jardine, Stuart Lang, Kevin McKenzie, John Manson, Cameron Murray, Scott Nichol, Guy Perrett, Bryan Redpath, Steven Reed, Stuart Reid, Brian Renwick, Rowen Shepherd, Graham Shiel, Tom Smith, Tony Stanger, Derek Stark, Barry Stewart, Rob Wainwright, Murray Wallace, Alan Watt and Scott Welsh.

Turbulent times

Some people involved in amateur club rugby didn't like the decision for the District clubs to become Scotland's representatives. Keith Robertson and Gavin Hastings had already argued against the District clubs at the SRU EGM.

Hastings then joined with former international Scotland captains Jim Aitken, Finlay Calder and David Sole to make a 'Gang of Four' which toured all over Scotland to promote the policy that club sides should represent Scotland in Europe.

Despite Greene being well-liked by the Glasgow players - Glasgow's flyhalf Calum MacGregor once gave this tribute of his boss: "Kevin Greene, the Glasgow coach, is the kind of man who makes the players think for themselves, like Ian McGeechan, and I prefer that to the blood-and-thunder approach. I have enjoyed playing for Glasgow this year more than any other. I look around at the young guys in the team and they are keen and excited and that makes me feel good about the game. The players have a belief in it and a desire to win and I like that." - this backdrop of resentment against the professional districts created a shaky start for the Glasgow team.

Team

Coaches
Head coach:  Kevin Greene
Assistant coach:  Gordon Macpherson

Manager

Convenor / Team Manager:  Hamish Fyfe

Squad

Academy players
None

Player statistics
During the 1996–97 season, Glasgow have used 30 different players in competitive games. The table below shows the number of appearances and points scored by each player.

Staff movements

Coaches

Personnel In

 Kevin Greene from  Glasgow Academicals
 Gordon Macpherson from  West of Scotland

Personnel Out

None

Player movements

Academy promotions

None

Player transfers

In

None

Out

None

Competitions

Pre-season and friendlies
None.

European Challenge Cup

The previous year's Scottish Inter-District Championship was a forgettable one for Glasgow who finished last. This meant that the SRU did not enter Glasgow in the Heineken Cup for the new season 1996-97. Instead Glasgow entered the lower European tournament, the Challenge Cup, or as it was then known the European Conference, in Pool A. This was one of 4 Pools in the tournament and Glasgow was Scotland's only representative.

Kevin Greene, the Glasgow coach, later admitted that preparation for Glasgow's first foray into Europe was poor. He recalled the first game against Newbridge:  "We had no information at all on Newbridge. We should at least have had some data and perhaps even a video, but the SRU had nothing. It made preparation very awkward."

Pool A

Results

Round 1

Round 2

Round 3

Round 4

Round 5

Scottish Inter-District Championship

It was decided that the Scottish Inter-District Championship places would decide which Scottish sides would enter the Heineken Cup and which would enter the European Challenge Cup.

The 4 newly professional district teams Glasgow Rugby, Edinburgh Rugby, Border Reivers and Caledonia Reds would play off for the Championship. As this decided European places it was decided that it was not appropriate for London Scottish or a Scottish Exiles side to be invited into the Championship.

Each team would play one another only once, swapping home and away each year. With only 4 teams this meant that the Championship was decided by each team playing just 3 matches.

The top 3 sides qualified for the Heineken Cup next season and the fourth qualified for the Challenge Cup. Due to the weather Glasgow's match against Edinburgh was switched to Murrayfield as its undersoil heating was best placed to deal with frost. Glasgow lost their final match against Caledonia Reds and finished 2nd behind the Reds. Caledonia Reds, the Border Reivers and Glasgow qualified for the Heineken Cup for the next season.

1996-97 League Table

Results

Round 1

Round 2

Round 3

Competitive debuts this season

A player's nationality shown is taken from the nationality at the highest honour for the national side obtained; or if never capped internationally their place of birth. Senior caps take precedence over junior caps or place of birth; junior caps take precedence over place of birth. A player's nationality at debut may be different from the nationality shown. Combination sides like the British and Irish Lions or Pacific Islanders are not national sides, or nationalities.

Players in BOLD font have been capped by their senior international XV side as nationality shown.

Players in Italic font have capped either by their international 7s side; or by the international XV 'A' side as nationality shown.

Players in normal font have not been capped at senior level.

A position in parentheses indicates that the player debuted as a substitute. A player may have made a prior debut for Glasgow Warriors in a non-competitive match, 'A' match or 7s match; these matches are not listed.

Tournaments where competitive debut made:

Crosshatching indicates a jointly hosted match.

Sponsorship

Main Sponsor

 Dundas & Wilson

Official Kit Supplier

Canterbury

References

1996-97
1996–97 in Scottish rugby union
1996–97 European Challenge Cup